Koilakuntla (also called as Kovelakuntla, Koyalakuntla, Koilkuntla) is a town  in Nandyal district of the Indian state of Andhra Pradesh. It is Head quarter of Koilakuntla mandal. in Dhone revenue division

Geography
It has an average elevation of 185 meters (610 feet). 85 km south of Kurnool town. There is a famous temple called Panduranga Swamy Temple which is established by king Penukonda Rajullu in 1560-1570.It has pond in front of the temple. The lady named Koilla guided the king to build the temple and due to the pond in front of the temple, the town was named as Koilakuntla. There is a confluence of Kundu river and Juleru river near Sagameswara temple in east side and in west side mosque. And in the centre of Koilakuntla, the south side is having Sidheswara temple and in north side mosque. That is why they are called as union of two religions of Hindu and Muslim. In 1847 Narasimha Reddy fought against the British and he was hanged to death by the British emperor near taluka office in Koilakuntla. In 1870 Buda Vengal Reddy helped poor people, native of Uyyalawada thaluka near Koilakuntla, so, Queen Victoria gave swarna Kanakam to him. This happened in the year 1850–1870.

Demographics 
Koilakuntla has a total population of 23,859 peoples. There are about 5,810 houses in Koilakuntla village. Nandyal is nearest big town to Koilakuntla which is approximately 39km away.

Transport 
The Andhra Pradesh State Road Transport Corporation operates bus services from Koilakuntla bus station with Koilakuntla Bus depot.

Distance to Major towns and cities 

 Kurnool = 81 km
 Nandyal = 40 km
 Allagadda = 31 km
 Adoni = 145 km
 Banaganapalle = 16 km
 Bethamcherla =36
 Dhone = 63 km
 Jammalamadugu = 48 km
 Proddutur = 68 km
 Kadapa = 125 km
 Tirupati = 265 km
 Hyderabad = 305 km
 Bengaluru = 330 km
 Vijayawada = 360 km
 Chennai = 375 km

Railways
Koilkuntla Railway Station is opened in 2016 as part of Nandyal - Yerraguntla Railway line. Now the line is fully electrified and soon IR is planning run electric locos. The station have 3 platforms and currently Dharmavaram-Vijayawada express is the only passenger train which is running.

Airways
Uyyalawada Narasimha Reddy Domestic Airport which is located in Orvakal-Kurnool is the nearest which is 70 km from Koilkuntla.

Rajiv Gandhi International Airport- Hyderabad which is 285 km away

Places of Interest 

1. Yaganti-30 km
2. Ahobilam- 50 km
3. Belum Caves- 40 km
4. Mahanandi-52 km

Movie Theaters
1. SLVT

2. AVR

3. PR

Banks

1. SBI main branch (code : 0984) 2. sbi rtc road 3. andhra bank 4. corporation bank 5. axis bank 6. KDCC 7. The Koilkuntla Cooperative Town Bank

References

Villages in Nandyal district